In the common law, judicial estoppel (also known as estoppel by inconsistent positions) is an estoppel that precludes a party from taking a position in a case that is contrary to a position it has taken in earlier legal proceedings. Although, in the United States, it is only a part of common law and therefore not sharply defined, it is generally agreed that it can only be cited if the party in question successfully maintained its position in the earlier proceedings and benefited from it.

In U.S. case law
Judicial estoppel is a doctrine that may apply in matters involving closed bankruptcies, wherein the former debtor attempts to lay claim to an asset that was not disclosed on the bankruptcy schedules. In an early U.S. articulation of the doctrine, the United States Supreme Court, in First National Bank of Jacksboro v. Lasater, 196 U.S. 115 (1905), held at 119: 
"It cannot be that a bankrupt, by omitting to schedule and withholding from his trustee all knowledge of certain property, can, after his estate in bankruptcy has been finally closed up, immediately thereafter assert title to the property on the ground that the trustee had never taken any action in respect to it. If the claim was of value (as certainly this claim was, according to the judgment below), it was something to which the creditors were entitled, and this bankrupt could not, by withholding knowledge of its existence, obtain a release from his debts and still assert title to the property." 

The principle was used in 2001 by a unanimous U.S. Supreme Court in the Piscataqua River border dispute, in which New Hampshire argued that the Portsmouth Naval Shipyard was in New Hampshire after having previously joined a consent decree that agreed on a border that would put it in Maine.

See also
Estoppel

External links
 Judicial Estoppel and Inconsistent Positions of Law Applied to Fact and Pure Law, Kira A. Davis, Cornell Law Review Vol. 89

Legal procedure
Equitable defenses
Estoppel
Common law legal terminology
Judicial legal terminology
American legal terminology